Karl Joseph Leyser  (24 October 1920 – 27 May 1992) was a German-born British historian who was Fellow and Tutor in History, Magdalen College, Oxford, from 1948 to 1984, and Chichele Professor of Medieval History at Oxford University, from 1984 to 1988.

Because he was Jewish, he escaped the Nazis before World War II. He was commissioned into the Black Watch in June 1944 and saw active service with the 7th Battalion in North-West Europe. He was married to Henrietta Leyser. Their daughter is the plant biologist Ottoline Leyser and their son the medievalist Conrad Leyser.

References 

1920 births
1992 deaths
British medievalists
Fellows of the British Academy
20th-century British historians
Fellows of Magdalen College, Oxford
Chichele Professors of Medieval History
Jewish emigrants from Nazi Germany to the United Kingdom
Corresponding Fellows of the Medieval Academy of America
Black Watch officers
British Army personnel of World War II